Cherry picking is the fallacy of selecting evidence that supports an argument while ignoring evidence that contradicts it.

Cherry picking may also refer to:

 Harvesting fruit from cherry trees
 Cherry picking (basketball), a strategy in basketball where a player stays near the opponents' goal rather than playing defense
 Cherry-picking tax avoidance, a form of tax avoidance in Australia in the 1970s and 1980s
 Cherry-picking, moving only some revisions from one branch to another in version control
 , the childish habit of picking out the cherries from a cherry cake, leaving the rest of the cake behind, used colloquially to suggest an effort to secure only the most attractive parts of something specific, leaving behind the unattractive parts

See also 
 Cherry picker (disambiguation)